Pavle Vagić (born 24 January 2000) is a Swedish footballer who plays as a centre-back or central midfielder for Hammarby IF in Allsvenskan.

Early life
Vagić was born in Malmö, Sweden, to parents of Serbian descent. At age six, he began to play youth football with local club Malmö FF.

Club career

Malmö FF
On 13 April 2017, Vagić was promoted to Malmö's first team together with Samuel Adrian, signing a three-year contract. On 29 October the same year, he made his debut for the club in Allsvenskan, coming on as a substitute in a 4–0 away win against IK Sirius. 

On 10 August 2018, Vagić signed a new three and a half-year contract with Malmö, while being sent on loan to Jönköpings Södra IF in Superettan for the remainder of the season. 

On 8 January 2019, Vagić was sent on loan to Mjällby AIF in Superettan, together with Felix Konstandeliasz from Malmö. After putting on impressive performances for Mjällby, that eventually went on to win the 2019 Superettan, Vagić's stint at the club was cut short on 14 July. Instead, Malmö sent him on loan to AFC Eskilstuna in Allsvenskan for the remainder of the year. 

Vagić began the 2020 season with Malmö, but failed to make any appearances for the club. On 2 July, he rejoined his former club Jönköpings Södra in Superettan on a six month-loan. 

On 23 March 2021, Vagić signed a new contract with Malmö, running until the end of 2024. He made seven league appearances for the club in the 2021 Allsvenskan, that Malmö eventually went on to win, before leaving in August after falling out of favor with head coach Jon Dahl Tomasson.

Rosenborg
On 12 August 2021, Vagić transferred to Rosenborg BK in the Norwegian Eliteserien, signing a contract until the end of 2025. The transfer fee was reportedly set at around 10 million SEK. Vagić made nine league appearances during the 2021 season, mainly as a centre-back, before being sidelined in November due to a knee ligament injury.

Hammarby IF
On 10 July 2022, Vagić transferred to Hammarby IF in Allsvenskan, signing a four and a half year-contract. The transfer fee was reportedly set at around 7 million SEK.

International career
Between 2015 and 2022, Vagić was capped for all Swedish youth teams from the under-17's to the under-21's, making 38 appearances for all selections.

On 10 June 2022, Vagić was called up to Sweden's 2022–23 UEFA Nations League away fixture against Norway. He remained on the bench for the whole game, that ended in a 3–2 loss for Sweden.

Career statistics
As of 27 February 2023.

Honours

Malmö FF
 Allsvenskan: 2021

References

External links
 Pavle Vagic at Malmö FF 
  (archive)
 
  (archive)

2000 births
Living people
Footballers from Skåne County
Swedish footballers
Sweden youth international footballers
Swedish people of Serbian descent
Malmö FF players
Jönköpings Södra IF players
Mjällby AIF players
AFC Eskilstuna players
Rosenborg BK players
Hammarby Fotboll players
Allsvenskan players
Eliteserien players
Superettan players
Association football midfielders